This is a list of dishes in the Cuisine of Morocco. Entries in beige color indicate types of generic foods.

Main dishes

Salads

Condiments and sauces

Desserts

Drinks

See also
 Moroccan cuisine

 List of Moroccan Authentic foods

References

Capetocasa Authentic Moroccan food

External links
 

 
Dishes
Lists of foods by nationality
-Moroccan Food